Cyperus denudatus, commonly known as the winged sedge, is a species of sedge that is native to parts of Africa, Asia and eastern parts of Australia.

The species was first described in 1782 by Carl Linnaeus the Younger.

See also 
 List of Cyperus species

References 

denudatus
Taxa named by Carl Linnaeus the Younger
Plants described in 1782
Flora of Queensland
Flora of India
Flora of Angola
Flora of Botswana
Flora of Burkina Faso
Flora of Burundi
Flora of South Africa
Flora of the Republic of the Congo
Flora of Ethiopia
Flora of Gabon
Flora of Ghana
Flora of Guinea
Flora of Ivory Coast
Flora of Kenya
Flora of Madagascar
Flora of Malawi
Flora of Mali
Flora of Mozambique
Flora of Namibia
Flora of Niger
Flora of Nigeria
Flora of Rwanda
Flora of Senegal
Flora of Sierra Leone
Flora of Sudan
Flora of Tanzania
Flora of Togo
Flora of Uganda
Flora of Vietnam
Flora of Zambia
Flora of Zimbabwe
Flora of the Democratic Republic of the Congo